The 1998 Australian Open was a tennis tournament played on outdoor hard courts at Albert Park in Melbourne in Victoria in Australia. It was the 86th edition of the Australian Open and was held from 19 January through 1 February 1998.

Seniors

Men's singles

 Petr Korda defeated  Marcelo Ríos 6–2, 6–2, 6–2
 It was Korda's only Grand Slam title.

Women's singles

 Martina Hingis defeated  Conchita Martínez 6–3, 6–3
 It was Hingis' 4th career Grand Slam title and her 2nd Australian Open title.

Men's doubles

 Jonas Björkman /  Jacco Eltingh defeated  Todd Woodbridge /  Mark Woodforde 6–2, 5–7, 2–6, 6–4, 6–3
 It was Björkman's 1st career Grand Slam title and his 1st Australian Open title. It was Eltingh's 4th career Grand Slam title and his 2nd and last Australian Open title.

Women's doubles

 Martina Hingis /  Mirjana Lučić defeated  Lindsay Davenport /  Natasha Zvereva 6–4, 2–6, 6–3
 It was Hingis' 7th career Grand Slam title and her 4th Australian Open title. It was Lučić's only career Grand Slam title.

Mixed doubles

 Venus Williams /  Justin Gimelstob defeated  Helena Suková /  Cyril Suk 6–2, 6–1
 It was Williams' 1st career Grand Slam title and her 1st Australian Open title. It was Gimelstob's 1st career Grand Slam title and his only Australian Open title.

Juniors

Boys' singles

 Julien Jeanpierre defeated  Andreas Vinciguerra 4–6, 6–4, 6–3

Girls' singles

 Jelena Kostanić defeated  Wynne Prakusya 6–0, 7–5

Boys' doubles

 Jérôme Haehnel /  Julien Jeanpierre defeated  Mirko Pehar /  Lovro Zovko 6–3, 6–3

Girls' doubles

 Evie Dominikovic /  Alicia Molik defeated  Leanne Baker /  Rewa Hudson 6–3, 3–6, 6–2

Notes

References

External links
 Australian Open Website

 
 

 
1998 in Australian tennis
January 1998 sports events in Australia
February 1998 sports events in Australia
1998,Australian Open